Cydnoides is a genus of black bugs in the family Thyreocoridae. There are about five described species in Cydnoides.

Species
These five species belong to the genus Cydnoides:
 Cydnoides albipennis (Say, 1859)
 Cydnoides ciliatus (Uhler, 1863)
 Cydnoides confusus McAtee and Malloch, 1933
 Cydnoides obtusus (Uhler, 1894)
 Cydnoides renormatus (Uhler, 1895)

References

Further reading

 
 
 
 
 
 
 

Shield bugs
Articles created by Qbugbot